The 2008 FIBA Europe Under-16 Championship was the 22nd edition of the FIBA Europe Under-16 Championship. The city of Chieti, in Italy, hosted the tournament. Lithuania won the trophy for the first time. Hungary and Georgia were relegated to Division B.

Teams

Preliminary round

Group A

Group B

Group C

Group D

Classification round

Group G

Qualifying round

Group E

Group F

Knockout stage

9th–12th playoffs

5th–8th playoffs

Championship

Final standings

See also
2008 FIBA Europe Under-16 Championship Division C

References
FIBA Archive
FIBA Europe Archive

  
FIBA U16 European Championship
2008–09 in European basketball
2008–09 in Italian basketball
International youth basketball competitions hosted by Italy